Echinoptilidae is a family of sea pens, a member of the subclass Octocorallia in the phylum Cnidaria.

Characteristics
Colonies are cylindrical without axis, and the rachis is generally longer than the peduncle. The colony may be radially or bilaterally symmetrical. Autozooids have non-retractile, bifurcated calyces with many sclerites.

Distribution
Indo-West Pacific to south western Africa in shallow sublittoral to over 800m depth.

Genera
The World Register of Marine Species list the following genera:
Genus Actinoptilum Kükenthal, 1911
Genus Echinoptilum Hubrecht, 1885

References

 
Pennatulacea
Cnidarian families